The highest-selling digital singles in the United States are ranked in the Hot Digital Songs chart, published by Billboard magazine. The data are compiled by Nielsen SoundScan based on each single's weekly digital sales, which combines sales of different versions of a single for a summarized figure.

Chart history

See also
2012 in music
List of Billboard Hot 100 number-one singles of 2012

References

United States Digital Songs
2012
Number-one digital songs